The 16th Biathlon European Championships were held in Ufa, Russia from February 28 to March 4, 2009.

There were total of 16 competitions held: sprint, pursuit, individual and relay both for U26 and U21.

Schedule of events 

The schedule of the event stands below. All times in CET.

Results

U26

Men's

Women's

U21

Men's

Women's

Medal table

External links 
 IBU full results
 EBCH-2009

 
Biathlon European Championships
International sports competitions hosted by Russia
2009 in biathlon
2009 in Russian sport
Sport in Ufa
Biathlon competitions in Russia